Going the Distance is a 1979 Canadian documentary film directed by Paul Cowan about the 1978 Commonwealth Games. Produced by the National Film Board of Canada, and produced by Robert Verrall and Jacques Bobet, it was nominated for an Academy Award for Best Documentary Feature.

Cowan, who had been chosen for the project on the basis of his previous sports specials, shot most of the film himself, delegating second-unit segments to Reevan Dolgoy, Georges Dufaux, Beverly Shaffer, Pierre Letarte and Tony Westman. Cowan chose to focus on eight athletes from four continents, including four Canadians: Toronto boxer John Raftery, thirteen-year-old Winnipeg gymnast Monica Goermann, and divers Linda Cuthbert and Janet Nutter. Also featured was New Zealand weightlifter Precious McKenzie. Athletes were filmed prior to the Games as well as in competition at the games in Edmonton.

The film had a budget of $840,000. Its broadcast premiere was on the CTV Television Network on August 4, 1979.

Awards
 C.I.D.A.L.C. International Festival of Sports Films, Torino: First Prize, Gold Plaque, 1982
Commonwealth Television and Film Festival, Nicosia: Best Film of the Festival, 1980
52nd Academy Awards, Los Angeles: Nominee: Best Documentary Feature, 1980

References

Works cited

External links

Watch Going the Distance at NFB.ca

1979 films
1979 documentary films
1979
Canadian sports documentary films
English-language Canadian films
Films directed by Paul Cowan
Films shot in Edmonton
Films produced by Robert Verrall
Films produced by Jacques Bobet
National Film Board of Canada documentaries
1970s English-language films
1970s Canadian films